German submarine U-574 was a Type VIIC U-boat of Nazi Germany's Kriegsmarine during World War II. She carried out one war patrol (partaking in two wolfpacks) and sank one warship of 1,190 tons. The U-boat was sunk west of Portugal on 19 December 1941.

Design
German Type VIIC submarines were preceded by the shorter Type VIIB submarines. U-574 had a displacement of  when at the surface and  while submerged. She had two shafts and two  propellers.

U-574 was fitted with five  torpedo tubes (four fitted at the bow and one at the stern), fourteen torpedoes, one  SK C/35 naval gun, 220 rounds, and a  C/30 anti-aircraft gun. The boat had a complement of between forty-four and sixty.

Service history
The submarine was laid down on 15 June 1940 at Blohm & Voss, Hamburg as yard number 550, launched on 12 April 1941 and commissioned on 12 June under the command of Oberleutnant zur See Dietrich Gengelbach.

She served with the 1st U-boat Flotilla from 12 June 1941 for training and stayed with that organization for operations until her loss, from 1 November 1941 until 19 December.

Operational career

Patrol and loss
The boat departed Kiel on 8 November 1941, moved through the North Sea, negotiated the gap between Iceland and the Faroe Islands and entered the Atlantic Ocean.

Just after sinking her only victim, the Royal Navy destroyer HMS Stanley, she was sunk near Punta Delgada by depth charges and ramming by the British sloop  on 19 December 1941. The boat was scuttled; the captain, Dietrich Gengelbach, refused to leave the submarine and went down with her.

Twenty-eight men died; there were 16 survivors.

Wolfpacks
U-574 took part in two wolfpacks, namely:
 Steuben (14 November – 1 December 1941) 
 Seeräuber (14 – 19 December 1941)

Summary of raiding history

References

Notes

Citations

Bibliography

External links

German Type VIIC submarines
U-boats commissioned in 1941
U-boats sunk in 1941
U-boats sunk by British warships
World War II submarines of Germany
1941 ships
World War II shipwrecks in the Atlantic Ocean
Ships built in Hamburg
Maritime incidents in December 1941